Dick de Zeeuw (January 24, 1924, Tanjung Pura, Langkat, Langkat Regency – February 18, 2009, Bangkok) was a Dutch politician and agronomist.

References 
  Parlement.com biography

1924 births
2009 deaths
Catholic People's Party politicians
20th-century Dutch politicians
Converts to Roman Catholicism from Calvinism
Chairmen of the Catholic People's Party
Dutch agronomists
Dutch civil servants
Dutch Roman Catholics
Members of the Senate (Netherlands)
People from Langkat Regency
Academic staff of Radboud University Nijmegen
Wageningen University and Research alumni
Academic staff of Wageningen University and Research
20th-century agronomists